A manciple  is a person in charge of the purchase and storage of food at an institution such as a college, monastery, or court of law. Manciples were sometimes also in charge of catering more generally, including food preparation.  

The title still survives in some Oxford and Cambridge colleges, at the Charterhouse in the City of London, in the Party of the Right of Yale University, in Freemasonry as the title of one of the council officers in the Order of Royal and Select Masters (or Council of Cryptic Masons), and in the name of Manciple Street in the borough of Southwark, London SE1.

The term comes from Middle English maunciple, taken from Old French, which in turn comes from the Latin mancipium, manceps, a purchaser of stores.

See also
The Manciple's Prologue and Tale
Kappiya, a similar role in Buddhism

References

Food services occupations